Superside, formerly Konsus, is a subscription design service that provides design at scale for enterprises and scale-ups.

Background
Konsus was founded by Fredrik Thomassen and Sondre Rasch in August 2015, and got accepted into Y Combinator startup incubator in January 2016. The company is based in Oslo and Palo Alto, but hires low-cost talent internationally.

In August 2016, Konsus raised $1.5M funding led by Sam Altman and Slack Fund.
An additional $3.5 million was raised in 2019. The company also announced a change of name from Konsus to Superside.

References

External links
Official Website

Freelance marketplace websites
Online marketplaces of the United States
Employment websites in the United States
American companies established in 2015
Business services companies established in 2015